Julie Marie Nolke is a Canadian comedian, actress, writer, and YouTuber. She is best known for her comedic YouTube series Explaining the Pandemic to my Past Self.

Career
Nolke initially started her YouTube channel Feeling Peckish in May 2015 as a hobby with her boyfriend Sam where she uploaded cooking videos. She was then hired by Tastemade to make videos, develop ideas for content, and to produce branded content. She has also starred in the Tastemade show One for the Road with Andrew Gunadie. She later changed her YouTube channel name to Julie Nolke, where she now uploads skits, parodies and vlogs. According to Nolke, the inspiration for her channel is: "I want to debunk this idea that women aren't funny. I think you can not only be a funny woman, but you can talk about things from a woman's perspective and have it be funny. That's the main mantra of the channel."

Her YouTube video Are We Bad Feminists? won the "Excellence in Writing" at the 2019 Buffer Festival. She also directed, wrote, and starred in a YouTube video When you buy ADULT TOYS online, which was nominated for the 2020 Outstanding Comedy Short at the Toronto Sketchfest "Best of the Fest" award show.

In April 2020, Nolke uploaded the first episode of Explaining the Pandemic to My Past Self to YouTube, a comedy sketch depicting her time-traveling to talk to her past self before the COVID-19 pandemic where she vaguely discusses various social and political issues that have arisen in the future with her past self, such as the pandemic, the George Floyd protests, and the 2020 Beirut explosion. The first several videos in the series collectively had more than 25 million views by October 2020. By January 2022, she had uploaded seven videos in the series. Explaining the Pandemic to My Past Self was nominated for a 2021 Webby Award in the Viral, General Video category. Nolke won 2021 Webby Awards in Best Individual Performance and two Audience Choice Awards for best viral video and best writing.

In addition to her YouTube channel, she has had roles in movies, short films, and television shows, including Oil Men, What We Do in the Shadows, TallBoyz, Workin' Moms,  and Run the Burbs. She starred in the comedy short Hashtag Apocalypse, which received an award of distinction at the 2019 Canada Shorts Film Festival. Nolke had a small role in Secret Society of Second-Born Royals, but has said her part was cut in the final version.

Personal life
Nolke was born in Calgary, Alberta. In 2019, Nolke married Samuel D. Larson, a fellow filmmaker and director who worked with Nolke on many projects. In February 2023, the couple announced that they are expecting, with the baby due sometime in late summer to early fall.

Filmography

References

External links
 
 What Would You Tell Your Pre-Pandemic Self? (KQED interview, March 15, 2021)
 Julie Nolke at Tastemade

Living people
1990 births
Canadian women comedians
Canadian YouTubers
21st-century Canadian actresses
21st-century Canadian screenwriters
Canadian women screenwriters